The 1972–73 Texaco Cup was the third edition of the tournament sponsored by Texaco. It was won by Ipswich Town, who beat Norwich City in a two-legged final by 4–2 on aggregate.

First round 1st leg

First round 2nd leg

Quarter-finals 1st leg

Quarter-finals 2nd leg

Semi-finals 1st leg

Semi-finals 2nd leg

Final 1st leg

Final 2nd leg

Notes and references

1972–73 in English football
1972–73 in Scottish football
England–Scotland relations